The Taipei Metro Xinbeitou branch line (formerly transliterated as Hsin Peitou branch line until 2003) is an elevated, high-capacity branch line of the Tamsui–Xinyi line. It first opened for service on 28 March 1997.

History

Heavy rail line 
The Xinbeitou branch line traces back to a heavy rail line built by the Japan's rule over Taiwan. A spur from the pre-metro Tamsui line, the line's name was transliterated as the "Shinhokutō line" in Japanese and "Hsin Peitou line" in Chinese. Completed on 1 April 1916, the line was built specifically to transport visitors from the city to the newly-developed onsen facilities around Xinbeitou. The line was closed at the end of 1944 during World War II. After a change in power to the Kuomintang, the Xinbeitou branch line was reopened to passengers in 1946.

The line was served by one-car diesel units that made round trips between Beitou and Xinbeitou stations. As Taipei's population grew, the branch transitioned from a tourism line to a commuter line, and was heavily used before its closure in 1988 for the reconstruction of the Beitou line into a rapid transit line (Tamsui–Xinyi line). Before the line's closure, the line was served by twenty-nine round trip services per day; each trip took around 90 seconds and cost . The daily ridership was around 22,000 passengers.

Metro line 
Originally, the Xinbeitou branch line was to close down after the Tamsui line was converted into a rapid transit line. Xinbeitou residents successfully petitioned to the government for a branch line, arguing that it was an important transportation link for commuters. groundbreaking ceremony was held 30 December 1988, and on 28 March 1997, the new rapid transit line re-opened for service as part of the Taipei Metro. According to the original design, trains leaving downtown Taipei would terminate at either Xinbeitou or  station. Before the line's opening, Taipei Metro decided against this plan due to insufficient rolling stock.

Noise complaints 
Since the line's opening, residents along the line have complained about noise from the trains due to the sharp curvature of the tracks and its close distance to apartment buildings on the sides. Rail grinding and the installation of noise barriers did not alleviate the noise by much. Shortly after opening, the train's frequency was reduced, the operating hours were shortened to 7 am and 9 pm, and the number of cars on each train was reduced from six to three.

On 14 September 2007, Taipei Metro extended its operating hours to between 6 am and midnight. It was hoped that if the noise standards were deemed to be at an acceptable level that the current Orange line trains on the Red line could operate on the Xinbeitou Line instead. Trains operate at a maximum headway of one per 7–8 minutes during peak hours.

It has been reported that the line is operating at a loss. A proposal was put forth in 2005 that a maglev train operation would solve the problem of noise pollution, but its feasibility on operating costs became a subject of ridicule.

Rolling stock 

A modified C301 (trainset 013/014) originally operated on the line in a 3-car formation, making it unique on the system. From 2007 onwards, the train was replaced by a purpose-built C371 of a similar length.

Stations

References 

Taipei Metro
Railway lines opened in 1997